The 2015 Toledo Rockets football team represented the University of Toledo in the 2015 NCAA Division I FBS football season. They were led by head coach Matt Campbell in his fourth year. They played their home games at the Glass Bowl and were members of the West Division of the Mid-American Conference. They finished the season 10–2, 6–2 in MAC play to finish in a four way tie for the West Division title. However, due to losses to Western Michigan and Northern Illinois, two other teams to finish 6–2 in the West Division, they did not represent the West Division in the MAC Championship Game. They were invited to the Boca Raton Bowl where they defeated #24 Temple.

On November 29, head coach Matt Campbell resigned to become the head coach at Iowa State. On December 2, offensive coordinator Jason Candle was promoted to head coach and led the Rockets in their bowl game.

Schedule

Schedule source

The game was delayed due to thunderstorms at 7:51 PM, and resumed at around 9:50 PM.  It was halted again just before the start of the second half and was then suspended at around 12:13 AM. Toledo was leading Stony Brook 16–7 prior to the game being suspended. Toledo wanted to resume the game the next day, but Stony Brook feared its players would not have been able to get home at a reasonable hour.  As there was no room to make the game up later in the season, it was officially declared "no contest."

Rankings

Victory over an SEC team
On September 12, 2015, the Rockets defeated the 18th-ranked team, the Arkansas Razorbacks at War Memorial Stadium in Little Rock, Arkansas It was Toledo's first win over an SEC team in four tries and the first time the Rockets defeated a Top 25 non-conference opponent on the road.

Senior quarterback Phillip Ely threw for 237 yards and Toledo's defense shut down Arkansas in the red zone as the Rockets upset the No. 18 Razorbacks, 16-12 in front of a stunned crowd of nearly 50,000. The Rockets held Arkansas to just 103 yards rushing on 31 attempts. Arkansas quarterback Brandon Allen did throw for 412 yards but the Razorbacks came away with just three points in four visits in the red zone in the second half. The outcome of the contest was not decided until the final play. With just one second remaining, Allen fired a pass from the 16-yard line into the end zone to Keon Hatcher that sailed over his head, igniting a celebration on the Toledo sideline.

It was the first win of what became a seven-game winning streak for the Rockets.

References

Toledo
Toledo Rockets football seasons
Boca Raton Bowl champion seasons
Toledo Rockets football